Ice & Coco is an American syndicated entertainment talk show hosted by Ice-T and Coco Austin. The series premiered on August 3, 2015, and received a three-week test run.

See also
Ice Loves Coco

References

External links
 
 
 

2010s American television talk shows
2015 American television series debuts
First-run syndicated television programs in the United States
Television series by Warner Bros. Television Studios
English-language television shows
Television shows set in New York City